"Something Old, Something New" is a country music song written by Eddy Arnold, Cy Coben, and Charles Grean, sung by Arnold, and released on the RCA Victor label. In July 1951, it reached No. 4 on the country juke box chart. It spent nine weeks on the charts and was the No. 22 country juke box record of 1951.

See also
 Billboard Top Country & Western Records of 1951

References

Eddy Arnold songs
1951 songs
Songs written by Eddy Arnold
Songs written by Cy Coben
Songs written by Charles Randolph Grean